Bhitarkanika National Park is a  large national park in northeast Kendrapara district in Odisha in eastern India. It was designated on 16 September 1998 and obtained the status of a Ramsar site on 19 August 2002. The area is also been designated as second Ramsar site of the State after the Chilika Lake.
Gahirmatha Beach and Marine Sanctuary are to the east, separating swamp region and mangroves from the Bay of Bengal.
The national park and wildlife sanctuary is inundated by the rivers Brahmani, Baitarani, Dhamra, Pathsala. It hosts many mangrove species, and is the second largest mangrove ecosystem in India.

The national park is home to Saltwater crocodile (Crocodylus porosus), Indian python, king cobra, black ibis, darters and many other species of flora and fauna.

Wildlife

Flora 

Mangroves are salt-tolerant, complex, and dynamic eco-systems that occur in tropical and subtropical intertidal regions. Bhitarkanika is one such location of rich, lush green vibrant ecosystem lying in the estuarine region of Brahmani - Baitarani in the North-Eastern corner of Kendrapara district of Odisha. The area is intersected by a network of creeks with the Bay of Bengal on the East. The alley between the meandering creeks and rivers houses the second largest viable mangrove eco-system of India. Its 672 km² of mangrove forest and wetland provides a home to well over 215 birds, including winter migrants from central Asia and Europe. Giant saltwater crocodiles and a variety of other wildlife inhabit this ecosystem, one of Asia's most spectacular wildlife sanctuaries.
An area of 145 km² has been notified as Bhitarkanika National Park vide Notification No.19686/F in September 1998 by the government of Odisha. It has much significance about ecological, geomorphological, and biological background which includes mangrove forests, rivers, creeks, estuaries, backwater, accreted land,  and mudflats. Bhitarkanika National Park is the core area of Bhitarkanika Sanctuary.

Bhitarkanika Wildlife Sanctuary was declared vide notification No.6958/FF AH on 22 April 1975 over an area of 672 km². The Sanctuary comprising mangrove forests meandering rivers, innumerable crisscrossed tidal inundated creeks provide the last refuge to the already endangered salt water crocodile (Crocodilus porosus). The sanctuary is rich in avifauna, mammalian, and reptilians and provides habitat for king cobra, Indian python, and Asian water monitor. Many water birds visit Bagagahan heronry, an area of approximately 4 ha within the Bhitarkanika Forest Block near Suajore creek from June to October. Most of the birds are Asian open bill, egrets, black ibis, cormorants, and darters. Mangrove species, casuarinas, and grasses like the indigo bush.

Fauna 

The park is home to the saltwater crocodile, Indian python, black ibis, wild boar, rhesus monkey, chital, darter, cobra, monitor lizard. Olive ridley turtles nest on Gahirmatha and other nearby beaches. Bhitarkanika has one of the largest populations of endangered saltwater crocodile in India and is globally unique in that, 10% of the adults exceed 6 m length.
Nearly 1671 saltwater crocodiles inhabit the rivers and creeks.
Around 3,000 saltwater crocodiles were born during 2014 annual breeding and nesting season.

Due to the difficulty of trapping and measuring a large living crocodile, the accuracy of these dimensions is yet to be verified. These observations and estimations have been made by park officials over the course of ten years, from 2006 to 2016, however, regardless of the skill of the observers it cannot be compared to a verified tape measurement, especially considering the uncertainty inherent in visual size estimation in the wild. The most recently published official park report shows an increase of adult crocodiles to 308 individuals, as well as a steady increase over the years. In the future, if conservation efforts pay off, these large individuals could be more common.

Per the 2014 survey of mammals, the first of its kind to be undertaken in the forest and wetland sites of the park; 1,872 spotted deer and 1,213 wild boar have made the forest areas their home. The census breakup of other mammals is monkeys: 1,522, jackals: 305, common langur: 39, otter: 38, sambar deer: 17, jungle cat: 11, fox: 10, Mongoose: 7, wolf: 7, and fishing cats: 12.

Avifauna includes 320 species, including eight kingfisher species. Birds such as Asian open bill, cormorants, darters, black ibis, and egrets are frequently seen in the park. Every year close to 120,000 winter visitors from abroad for wintering and 80,000 resident birds from different parts of India arrive for nesting during the monsoon season.

Attractions

It is a very good place to sight the giant Salt Water Crocodile, some growing to 23 feet in length, along with other reptiles like the Water Monitor Lizard and the King Cobra. Spotted deers and wild boars are abundant in the park and can be spotted at all the major locations. Eight varieties of Kingfishers are found here and can be spotted along the many creeks and riverines within the park.

The boat ride from Khola to Dangmal or vice versa is highly recommended. Khola is one of the gateways into the park. This is along an artificial creek and it passes through dense mangrove forest providing a glimpse into the estuarine ecosystem and its wealth of fauna. The best time to travel through this creek is early morning or before sunset.

Bhitarkanika has a very rich historical and cultural past. It used to be the hunting grounds of the erstwhile King of Kanika . The hunting towers and artificial watering holes can be seen at many places including Bhitarkanika trail and at Dangmal. It is also the home of medieval Hindu temples which can be found dotted throughout the sanctuary. But the major attraction remains the wildlife wealth.

References

External links 

National parks in Odisha
Protected areas established in 1975
1975 establishments in Orissa